Katy Elise Johanne Valentin (29 March 1902 - 30 May 1970) was a Danish stage and film actress.

Filmography
Filmens helte - 1928
Hallo, Afrika forude - 1929
Så til søs - 1933
Komtessen på Stenholt - 1939
Det brændende spørgsmål - 1943
Otte akkorder - 1944
Elly Petersen - 1944
Biskoppen - 1944
Så mødes vi hos Tove -  1946
Dorte - 1951
Bag de røde porte - 1951
Det store løb - 1952

External links

Danish stage actresses
Danish film actresses
Actresses from Copenhagen
1902 births
1970 deaths
20th-century Danish actresses